Ludwik Holcman (1889 – August 1942) was a Polish violinist.

Holcman was a violinist in the Warsaw Ghetto Symphony Orchestra that was led by Simon Pullman.  As he was Jewish, he was transported to Treblinka extermination camp with all the members of the orchestra early in August 1942, where they were killed, presumably shortly after their arrival.

References

External links
pic

1889 births
1942 deaths
Jewish violinists
Polish civilians killed in World War II
Polish violinists
Male violinists
Warsaw Ghetto inmates
Polish people who died in Treblinka extermination camp
20th-century violinists
20th-century male musicians